Suvendra Nath Bhattacharyya (born 4 October 1975) is an Indian molecular biologist, epigeneticist and the principal scientist at the Indian Institute of Chemical Biology of the Council of Scientific and Industrial Research. He is a recipient of the Swarnajayanthi Fellowship of the Department of Science and Technology and the National Bioscience Award of the Department of Biotechnology. The Council of Scientific and Industrial Research, the apex agency of the Government of India for scientific research, awarded him the Shanti Swarup Bhatnagar Prize for Science and Technology, one of the highest Indian science awards, in 2016, for his contributions to biological sciences.

Biography 
Suvendra Nath Bhattacharyya, born on 4 October 1975 in the Indian state of West Bengal, did his early schooling at Harinavi DVAS High School. He completed his M.Sc. from Ballygunge Campus of Calcutta University. After securing a PhD from Jadavpur University, he joined the Indian Institute of Chemical Biology (IICB) as a research fellow in 1998 and on completion of the fellowship in 2003, he moved to Friedrich Miescher Institute where he did his post-doctoral studies from 2004 to 2008 on a Human Frontier Science Program fellowship. Returning to India the same year, he joined IICB as a scientist at the Molecular and Human Genetics Division. He heads the RNA Biology Research Laboratory (RBRL, popularly known as Bhattacharyya Lab) of the institute where serves as the principal investigator and hosts a number of research scholars.

Legacy 

Bhattacharyya's researches at RBRL is mainly on microRNA (miRNA), focusing on its compartmentalization, regulation and mediation as well as its alteration in Leishmania invaded macrophage and neighboring non-macrophage cells. His researches assisted in identifying cholesterol as a modulator in leishmaniasis infection and his team has developed a therapeutic protocol for treating leishmaniasis by administering microRNA molecules in patients which has been found to raise the cholesterol level which in turn reduced the parasite levels. The treatment, combined with other drugs have been reported to be effective in treating the disease commonly known as Kala azar, which has a reported high drug resistance. One of his earlier projects, Mechanism of mRNA compartmentalization in the cytoplasm of mammalian cells, was funded by the Wellcome Trust. On his current project, miRNA  and Stability, he has worked on the mammalian immune and cancer cells and reportedly discovered miRNA activity modulation mechanisms in those cells.

At his laboratory, Bhattacharyya mentors many post-doctoral and doctoral researchers. He has published several articles in peer-reviewed journals and the online knowledge repositories which have listed his articles include ResearchGate, Google Scholar, and PubMed. He is a member of the Neurobiology Task force of the Department of Biotechnology and was a member of Local Organizing Committee of the APSN-ISN Neuroscience School held in January 2014. He has delivered several featured talks and has assisted others in their researches.

Awards and honors 
Suvendra Bhattacharyya received the Young Scientist Award of the AAAS-GE Healthcare in 2004. He also received the Young Scientist Award of the Indian National Science Academy the same year. The Human Frontier Science Program Organization awarded him the Career Development Award and he was selected for the Swarnajayanthi Fellowship of the Department of Science and Technology, both the honors reaching him in 2008. He received the National Bioscience Award for Career Development of the Department of Biotechnology and the NASI-Scopus Young Scientist Award of the Elsevier and National Academy of Sciences, India in 2015. The Council of Scientific and Industrial Research awarded Bhattacharyya, a recipient of the 2016 Prof. B. K. Bachhawat Memorial Travel Award, the Shanti Swarup Bhatnagar Prize, one of the highest Indian science awards, in 2016. He was one among the 12 Young Achievers of Modern India and featured in the 2016 Calendar of the Shoolini University.

Selected bibliography

See also 
 microRNA
 Leishmaniasis

Notes

References

External links 
 
 
 

Recipients of the Shanti Swarup Bhatnagar Award in Biological Science
Living people
Indian scientific authors
20th-century Indian biologists
1975 births
Scientists from Kolkata
Bengali scientists
N-BIOS Prize recipients
Jadavpur University alumni
Indian molecular biologists
Epigeneticists